The Municipal Light Plant is a historic building in the Arena District of Downtown Columbus, Ohio. It was listed on the National Register of Historic Places in 2015. The structure includes an early 20th century Romanesque Revival building and a mid-20th century Art Deco addition.

See also
 List of Art Deco architecture in the United States
 National Register of Historic Places listings in Columbus, Ohio

References

External links

Arena District
Commercial buildings on the National Register of Historic Places in Ohio
Commercial buildings completed in 1924
National Register of Historic Places in Columbus, Ohio
Buildings in downtown Columbus, Ohio